A.E. Karitsa Football Club is a Greek football club, based in Karitsa, Pieria, Greece

History
AE Karitsa was founded in 1981 and is a team of Pieria. In 2016–17, they finished second in the championship in Pieria, but because champion Poseidon P. Poron said he was unable at the last minute to advance to the 3rd round, Karitsa's team took over. He has previously played in the Delta Ethniki and has always played in Pieria football.

Honours

Domestic

  Pieria FCA Champions: 2
 1997–98, 2018–19

References

Football clubs in Central Macedonia
Pieria
Association football clubs established in 1981
1981 establishments in Greece
Gamma Ethniki clubs